Balsamia is a genus of truffle-like ascomycete fungi of the family Helvellaceae. The widespread genus contains twenty five species known from Europe, North America, North Africa and Asia, including China.

References

External links

Pezizales
Pezizales genera